Yevhen, also spelled Evhen, is a common Ukrainian given name. Its Old Church Slavonic form Евгении came from the Greek  Eugenios (masculine form), names derived from the Greek adjective , literally "well-born".

Yevhen is the Ukrainian equivalent of the English given name Eugene.
People with the given name include

 Yevhen Adamtsevych, blind Ukrainian kobzar-bandurist
 Yevhen Apryshko (born 1985), Ukrainian footballer
 Yevhen Baryshnikov, a Ukrainian football defensive midfielder who plays for FC Kryvbas Kryvyi Rih
 Yevhen Braslavets, Ukrainian sailor and Olympic champion
 Yevhen Bredun, Ukrainian football defender who plays for FC Sevastopol
 Yevhen Budnik, Ukrainian football midfielder for Metalist Kharkiv
 Yevhen Cheberyachko, Ukrainian footballer
 Yevhen Chepurnenko,  Ukrainian football striker who plays for FC Lviv
 Yevhen Chernenko, Ukrainian archaeologist
 Yevhen Drahunov, Ukrainian footballer
 Yevhen Fedorovych Stankovych, Ukrainian composer
 Yevhen Hrebinka, Ukrainian romantic, writer and poet
 Yevhen Hutsalo, Ukrainian writer and journalist
 Yevhen Khacheridi, Ukrainian footballer
 Evhen Khytrov (born 1988), Ukrainian boxer
 Yevhen Konoplyanka (born 1989), Ukrainian footballer
 Yevhen Konovalets (1891–1938), Ukrainian military commander and political leader of the Ukrainian nationalist movement
 Yevhen Kucherevskyi, Ukrainian football coach
 Yevhen Kushnaryov, Ukrainian politician
 Yevhen Lapinsky, Ukrainian volleyball player
 Yevhen Lemeshko, Ukrainian football coach
 Yevhen Levchenko, Ukrainian footballer
 Yevhen Lozynskyi, Ukrainian football defender who plays for FC Zorya Luhans
 Yevhen Lutsenko, Ukrainian footballer who plays for SC Tavriya Simferopol
 Yevhen Lysytsyn, Ukrainian footballer
 Yevhen Marchuk, Ukrainian statesman and politician
 Yevhen Novak, a  Ukrainian footballer who plays for FC Dynamo-2 Kyiv
 Yevhen Pavlov, Ukrainian football striker who plays for FC Volyn Lutsk
 Yevhen Petrushevych, Ukrainian lawyer, politician and president of the Western Ukrainian National Republic
 Yevhen Pisotskyi (born 1987), Ukrainian footballer
 Yevhen Pokhlebayev, Ukrainian footballer
 Yevhen Pronenko (born 1984), Ukrainian footballer
 Yevhen Rudakov (1942–2011), Ukrainian football goalkeeper
 Yevhen Seleznyov (born 1985), Ukrainian footballer
 Yevhen Selin, Ukrainian football defender who plays for Vorskla Poltava
 Yevhen Semenenko, Ukrainian triple jumper
 Yevhen Shakhov (footballer born 1962), Ukrainian footballer
 Yevhen Shakhov (footballer born 1990), Ukrainian footballer
 Evhen Shapoval (born 1987), Ukrainian footballer
 Yevhen Shevchenko, Ukrainian football striker
 Yevhen Shmakov, Ukrainian football midfielder who is currently playing for Simurq PFC
 Evhen Tsybulenko (born 1972), Estonian professor of international law
 Yevhen Vynohradov, Ukrainian hammer thrower
 Yevhen Yevseyev (1987–2011), Ukrainian footballer

References

See also 
 

Ukrainian masculine given names